Huntley Project High School is a high school in Worden, Montana. Home of the Red Devils, the Huntley Project School District serves students living in four small Montana communities: Worden, Ballantine, Huntley, and Pompey's Pillar, with total population nearing 3,000 people.

On September 18, 2008, an early morning fire destroyed the high school building in Worden.

About the school 
Total 2006-2007 enrollment is 739 students, grades kindergarten through 12th grade. The high school currently has 226 students, making Huntley Project a Class B school in the Montana High School Association.

The name ‘Huntley Project’ is short for Huntley Irrigation Project, which was the second U.S. Bureau of Reclamation irrigation project.

Huntley Projects stated goals are for their students learn and develop citizenship.

It was one of many schools designed by the firm Johnson-Graham & Associates.

Athletics 
Huntley Project Red Devils participate in Montana's Class B in the following athletic programs.
 Football 
 Volleyball 
 Cross Country
 Boys' Basketball 
 Girls' Basketball 
 Wrestling 
 Boys' and Girls' Track
 Softball 
 Golf

Activities 
Huntley Project students participate in the following extra-curricular clubs and activities.
 Student Council 
 Cheerleading
 BPA
 FFA 
 Pep Club 
 National Honor Society 
 Band, including pep band and concert band
 Choir 
 Speech and Drama (State Championships: 2004, 2018)
 FCCLA
 Newspaper, the "Red and Black Attack," and Annual                                * HP News

Awards 

 In March 2022, a group of students was awarded the TechRise grant from NASA for their plan to research food cultivation in space.

Fire 
On September 18, 2008, an early morning fire destroyed the high school building in Worden. The fire destroyed nine classrooms, the home economics room, the library and computer lab, three offices, the high school gym and the band room. The concession stand, school trophies and other memorabilia were also destroyed.

Early reports said the fire was "suspicious" in nature. Yellowstone County deputies arrested four teens, all current or former Huntley Project students, in connection with the fire. Court records say that the four teens broke into the school, damaged several doors and vandalized the chemistry room and other rooms, broke into a vending machine for snacks and took footballs before leaving the building. Court records say the teens later returned to the school and set fires in the chemistry room and an office.

Gregory Dean Three Fingers, 18, was charged in Yellowstone County Justice Court with arson and burglary. He was arraigned on felony charges on September 26, 2008. Michael John Victoria II, 16, was charged as an adult in District Court with arson and burglary as well. He pleaded not guilty. Two younger teens, a boy and girl both aged 14, were cited in youth court in connection with the fire.

After the fire, students returned to classes in modular buildings moved onto the school campus, which will be used, along with spare rooms in other buildings and around town, as classrooms until a new school can be built. The school and campus were insured for more than $6 million.

References

Public high schools in Montana
Schools in Yellowstone County, Montana
Educational institutions established in 1968
Public middle schools in Montana
Public elementary schools in Montana